Melisa Matheus (born 14 June 1998) is a Namibian footballer who plays as a goalkeeper for the Namibia women's national team.

International career
Matheus capped for Namibia at senior level during the 2018 Africa Women Cup of Nations qualification.

References

1998 births
Living people
Namibian women's footballers
Namibia women's international footballers
Women's association football goalkeepers